Burnquist is a surname. Notable people with the surname include:

Bob Burnquist (born 1976), Brazilian-American skateboarder
Joseph A. A. Burnquist (1879–1961), American attorney and politician

See also
Burnquist House, a historic house in St. Paul, Minnesota, United States